Martin McKenna may refer to:

 Marty McKenna, British reality television personality
 Martin McKenna (politician), brewer and politician in Victoria, Australia
 Martin McKenna (artist), British artist and illustrator
 Martin McKenna (astronomer) (born 1978), after whom the asteroid  is named